Vola Vale (born Vola Smith; February 12, 1897 – October 17, 1970) was a silent film actress.

Early career
Vale was born in Buffalo, New York and educated in Chevy Chase, Maryland. Her high school friends in Rochester, New York, where she was raised, knew her as Vola Smith. She began her career in amateur theatricals in Rochester. Then she played in stock companies for a while.

After working under Bert Lytell on stage, in 1916 Vale began working in film for Biograph, under the tutelage of the film director D.W. Griffith. After a month of playing atmosphere parts, Vola was offered a genuine role. She wore a velvet gown with a train and a feathered hat. Soon she was appearing in short reel films for Biograph. Among the actors she was cast with were William S. Hart, Sessue Hayakawa, Tsuru Aoki, William Haines, Harry Carey, Tully Marshall and William Russell.

She was adept in playing Spanish, Italian, French, and Gypsy roles. Aside from Biograph Vola worked for Fox Film, Famous Players-Lasky, Universal Pictures, and Paramount Pictures.

Serious Actress

Her ambition was to play Madame Butterfly with an actual Japanese company, as well as to act as Lorna Doone. She was most inspired by Hayakawa and hoped to learn to act inside, as he did. With Sessue Hayakawa, she made Each To His Kind (1917). Before filming began it was decided that the name Smith was too common to be used by a motion picture star. She changed her professional
name to Vola Vale.

Vale reflected in the early 1920s about observation, particularly its power in attaining one's acting proficiency. It is the ability of the actress to see and note of the little things in life and then store them in her subconscious mind where they await her call to use at the psychological moment before the camera that enables her to either register success in her chosen work, or be merely mediocre. She began this process as a youth acting with D.W. Griffith. She observed how the director took notice of everything the actors did.

Model
Vale modeled clothes for the Broadway Department Store in Los Angeles, California. A 1916 photo from the Los Angeles Times shows her in an exclusive Betty Wales frock from Broadway. This was a very popular dress among college women of the era.

Private life
Vale was married to film director and producer Al Russell. They had a son. On December 8, 1926, Vale married director John. W. Gorman in Santa Ana, California. They kept the wedding secret until they told friends on February 2, 1927. She married a second time to Lawrence McDougal, with whom she remained until his death in February 1970.

She was a member of Our Club, a group of seventeen of Hollywood's baby cinema stars. Mary Pickford served as honorary president. Fellow members were Mildred Davis, Helen Ferguson, Patsy Ruth Miller, Clara Horton, Gertrude Olmstead, Laura La Plante, Virginia Fox, Colleen Moore, ZaSu Pitts, Lois Wilson, May McAvoy, Gloria Hope, Virginia Valli, Carmel Myers, Edna Murphy, and Carmelita Geraghty.

Vale died in Hawthorne, California in 1970, aged 73, of heart disease. She is interred at Roosevelt Memorial Park in Los Angeles County, California.

Filmography

References
 

Los Angeles Times, "New Types, Delicate Hues at Dahlia Show", Page II3.
Los Angeles Times, "Star Says Keep Eyes Working", September 9, 1923, Page III27.
Los Angeles Times, "Our Club Initiates Trio", October 23, 1923, Page II1.
Newark Daily Advocate, "Tonight and Tomorrow", Friday, March 2, 1917, Page 9.
Olean Evening Herald, "News Notes from Movieland",  Friday Evening, May 9, 1919, Page 4.
Sandusky Star-Journal, "News Notes from Movieland", Friday, November 2, 1917, Page 11.

External links

American film actresses
American silent film actresses
Actresses from Buffalo, New York
1897 births
1970 deaths
Female models from New York (state)
People from Hawthorne, California
20th-century American actresses